The 1994 Shreveport mayoral election resulted in the election of Republican councilman  Robert W. "Bo" Williams in the race to succeed incumbent Hazel Beard. The primary election was held on October 1, 1994. Williams and fellow councilman Roy Cary advanced to the general election held on November 8, 1994.

Notably, incumbent mayor Beard decided not to run for re-election though she has served only one term and was eligible to contest another race. Former mayor John Brennan Hussey ran in the primary, but came third and therefore did not advance to the general election. This was the last time in which a Republican was elected mayor of Shreveport until 2022.

Results

|}

|}

References

Shreveport
Government of Shreveport, Louisiana
1994 Louisiana elections
October 1994 events in the United States